This is a list of extinct animals of India.

Prehistoric extinctions 
 Asian straight-tusked elephant (Palaeoloxodon namadicus) Late Pleistocene
Stegodon namadicus Late Pleistocene
Hexaprotodon (Indian hippopotamus) Late Pleistocene
Equus namadicus  Late Pleistocene
Bharattherium
Sivatherium
Bramatherium
Megalochelys atlas

Recent extinctions 
Indian aurochs (Bos primigenius namadicus)
Pink-headed duck (Rhodonessa caryophyllacea; possibly extant in Myanmar)
Sunderban dwarf rhinoceros (Rhinoceros sondaicus inermis)
Northern Sumatran rhinoceros (Dicerorhinus sumatrensis lasiotis)
Asiatic cheetah (Acinonyx jubatus venaticus; now found only in Iran, Southeast African cheetahs from Namibia were "reintroduced" to Kuno National Park, India in March 2023 but it is a different subspecies from the Asiatic cheetah)

See also 

 List of endangered animals in India
 List of endemic and threatened plants of India
 Lists of extinct species
 Cheetah reintroduction in India

References

India
Extinct animals of India